Yagi may refer to:

Places
Yagi, Kyoto, in Japan
Yagi (Kashihara), in Nara Prefecture, Japan
Yagi-nishiguchi Station, in Kashihara, Nara, Japan
Kami-Yagi Station, a JR-West Kabe Line station located in 3-chōme, Yagi, Asaminami-ku, Hiroshima, Hiroshima Prefecture, Japan
Rikutyū-Yagi Station, a railway station on the East Japan Railway Company Hachinohe Line located in Hirono, Iwate Prefecture, Japan
Yamato-Yagi Station, a Kintetsu Corporation railway train station situated in the Nara Prefecture

Other uses
Yagi (surname)
Typhoon Yagi (disambiguation)
Yagi (Usagi Yojimbo), a comic book character
Yagi–Uda antenna, a directional radio antenna
Yagibushi, a popular Japanese folk song and dance